Compsoctena lycophanes is a moth in the family Eriocottidae. It was described by Edward Meyrick in 1924. It is found in South Africa, where it has been recorded from the Western Cape.

References

Endemic moths of South Africa
Moths described in 1924
Compsoctena
Lepidoptera of South Africa